James Jones is an American former Negro league outfielder who played in the 1940s.

Jones played for the Baltimore Elite Giants in 1943. In 26 recorded games, he posted 18 hits in 77 plate appearances.

References

External links
 and Seamheads

Year of birth missing
Place of birth missing
Baltimore Elite Giants players